The City of Shepparton was a local government area in the Goulburn Valley region, about  north of Melbourne, the state capital of Victoria, Australia. It excluded areas such as Mooroopna and Kialla, which are now considered to be suburbs.

History

On 31 May 1927, the Shepparton Riding of the Shire of Shepparton was severed, and became a borough. On 16 March 1949, it achieved city status and was proclaimed by the Governor of Victoria on 2 February 1950. The city annexed land in neighbouring districts on 26 May 1948 and 1 October 1961.

On 18 November 1994, the City of Shepparton was abolished, and along with the Shires of Rodney and Shepparton, and some neighbouring districts, was merged into the newly created City of Greater Shepparton.

Wards

The City of Shepparton was divided into three wards on 31 May 1988, each of which elected three councillors:
 Central Ward
 Deakin Ward
 Wilmot Ward

Towns and localities
 Grahamvale
 Shepparton*
 Shepparton North

* Council seat.

Population

* Estimate in the 1958 Victorian Year Book.

References

External links
 Victorian Places - Shepparton

Shepparton City
Shepparton